NGC 523, also known as Arp 158, from the ARP catalog is a spiral galaxy located in the constellation Andromeda. It was discovered separately by William Herschel on 13 September 1784, and by Heinrich d'Arrest on 13 August 1862. d'Arrest's discovery was listed as NGC 523, while Herschel's was listed as NGC 537; the two are one and the same. John Dreyer noted in the New General Catalogue that NGC 523 is a double nebula.

In September 2001 a type Ia supernova, SN 2001en was discovered in NGC 523.

See also 
 Spiral galaxy 
 List of NGC objects (1–1000)
 Andromeda (constellation)

References

External links 
 
 
 SEDS

Andromeda (constellation)
Barred spiral galaxies
0523
158
Discoveries by William Herschel
005268